Stentor, sometimes called trumpet animalcules, are a genus of filter-feeding, heterotrophic ciliates, representative of the heterotrichs. They are usually horn-shaped, and reach lengths of two millimeters; as such, they are among the largest known extant unicellular organisms. They reproduce asexually through binary fission.

Description
The body, or cortex, is generally horn-shaped, hence the association with the Greek herald, and the former name "trumpet animalcule". A ring of prominent cilia around the anterior "bell" sweep in food and aid in swimming.  Some reach several millimeters in length, making them among the largest single-celled organisms. Stentor can come in different colors: for example, S. coeruleus can appear blue due to the presence of stentorin, a natural pigment. As in many freshwater protozoans, Stentor has a contractile vacuole.  Because the concentration of salt inside the cell and in the surrounding freshwater is different, Stentor must store water that enters it by osmosis and then discharge it from the vacuole.  They can regenerate, and small fragments can grow into full organisms. Each cell has one (often elongated) macronucleus and several micronuclei.

Ecology
These protists are common worldwide in freshwater lakes and streams; only S. multiformis has been recorded from marine, freshwater, and even terrestrial biotopes. They are usually attached to algal filaments or detritus.  Some Stentor species, such as S. polymorphus, can live symbiotically with certain species of green algae (Chlorella).  After being ingested, the algae live on while their host absorbs nutrients produced, whereas the algae, in turn, absorb and feed on the Stentor metabolic wastes.  Stentor species react to outside disturbances by contracting into a ball. Resting cysts are known from a few species.

Systematics
The genus contains over twenty described species (see list in box).  The genus Stentor was named in 1815 by the German biologist Lorenz Oken (1779–1851).

The type species of the genus is Stentor muelleri Ehrenberg, 1831. According to recent molecular analyses, the genus seems to be monophyletic, and related to the genus Blepharisma.

Video gallery

References

External links
 

Tartar, Vance. (1961) The biology of Stentor. New York, Pergammon Press. https://archive.org/details/biologyofstentor00tart

Heterotrichea
Taxa described in 1815
Articles containing video clips
Ciliate genera